Xu Jianping (Chinese: 許建平;  February 1, 1955- December 15, 2015) was a Chinese international football player. Throughout his career he played for Liaoning and Dalian and represented China in the 1980 AFC Asian Cup.

Career statistics

International statistics

Death
On 15 December 2015, Xu Jianping died of stomach cancer in Dalian, aged 60.

References

External links
Team China Stats

1955 births
2015 deaths
Chinese footballers
China international footballers
Tianjin Jinmen Tiger F.C. players
Dalian Shide F.C. players
liaoning F.C. players
1980 AFC Asian Cup players
Footballers at the 1986 Asian Games
Association football goalkeepers
Asian Games competitors for China
people from Dalian